Albury, an electoral district of the Legislative Assembly in the Australian state of New South Wales, was created in 1880.  It was abolished in 1920 when multiple member constituencies were established using the Hare-Clark single transferable vote.  It was re-created in 1927 when the state returned to single member electorates.


Members

Election results

Elections in the 2010s

2019

2015

2011

Elections in the 2000s

2007

2003

Elections in the 1990s

1999

1995

1991

Elections in the 1980s

1988

1984

1981

Elections in the 1970s

1978

1976

1973

1971

Elections in the 1960s

1968

1965

1962

Elections in the 1950s

1959

1956

1953

1950

Elections in the 1940s

1947

1946 by-election

1944

1941

Elections in the 1930s

1938

1935

1932

1930

Elections in the 1920s

1927
This section is an excerpt from 1927 New South Wales state election § Albury

1920 - 1927
District abolished

Elections in the 1910s

1917
This section is an excerpt from 1917 New South Wales state election § Albury

1913
This section is an excerpt from 1913 New South Wales state election § Albury

1910
This section is an excerpt from 1910 New South Wales state election § Albury

Elections in the 1900s

1907
This section is an excerpt from 1907 New South Wales state election § Albury

1904
This section is an excerpt from 1904 New South Wales state election § Albury

1901
This section is an excerpt from 1901 New South Wales state election § Albury

Elections in the 1890s

1898
This section is an excerpt from 1898 New South Wales colonial election § Albury

1895
This section is an excerpt from 1895 New South Wales colonial election § Albury

1894
This section is an excerpt from 1894 New South Wales colonial election § Albury

1891
This section is an excerpt from 1891 New South Wales colonial election § Albury

Elections in the 1880s

1889
This section is an excerpt from 1889 New South Wales colonial election § Albury

1887
This section is an excerpt from 1887 New South Wales colonial election § Albury

1885
This section is an excerpt from 1885 New South Wales colonial election § Albury

1882
This section is an excerpt from 1882 New South Wales colonial election § Albury

1880
This section is an excerpt from 1880 New South Wales colonial election § Albury

Notes

References

New South Wales state electoral results by district